The Sea Is Behind is a 2014 Moroccan drama film directed by Hicham Lasri. It was screened in the Panorama section of the 65th Berlin International Film Festival.

Cast
 Malek Akhmiss as Tarik
 Fairouz Amiri as Dalenda
 Mohamed Aouragh as Murad
 Hassan Ben Badida as Daoud
 Salah Bensalah as Lotfi
 Najat Khairallah as The veterinary
 Adil Lasri as Adil
 Yassine Sekkal as Mikhi
 Zineb Smaiki as Mother of Murad
 Hanane Zouhdi as Rita

See also
 List of lesbian, gay, bisexual or transgender-related films of 2015

References

External links
 

2014 films
2014 drama films
2010s Arabic-language films
Moroccan black-and-white films
Moroccan drama films
Films directed by Hicham Lasri